Goosepond Mountain State Park, also known as Goose Pond Mountain State Park, is a  undeveloped state park located in Orange County, New York. The park is located within the Town of Chester and is administered by the Palisades Interstate Park Commission.

Park description
Goosepond Mountain State Park is an undeveloped park, and is available for passive recreation such as hiking, horseback riding, and bird watching. A small section is accessible to casual hikers via a boardwalk, and there are additional extensive trails for hikers and horseback riders. Part of the area is a wetland used as a bird sanctuary.

The loyalist leader Claudius Smith may have used a rock shelter in the area as a hideout during the American Revolutionary War.

Gallery

See also 

 List of New York state parks

References

External links
 New York State Parks: Goosepond Mountain State Park

Palisades Interstate Park system
Parks in Orange County, New York
State parks of New York (state)
Protected areas established in 1960
1960 establishments in New York (state)